"Dunkie Butt" was the lead single released from 12 Gauge's debut album 12 Gauge.

One of many Miami bass influenced hits in the early to mid 1990s, "Dunkie Butt (Stand In A Line and Donkey-Donkey)" was released in late 1993 and spent 21 weeks on the Billboard Hot 100, eventually peaking at 28 in April of the following year. The song was certified gold by the RIAA on April 11, 1994 and sold 600,000 copies. "Dunkie Butt" was the rapper's only top 40 hit, making him a one-hit wonder.

Single track listing

A-Side
"Dunkie Butt" (Radio Version)- 4:19 
"Dunkie Butt" (Album Version)- 4:26

B-Side
"Dunkie Butt" (Funky Bass Mix)- 4:44 
"Dunkie Butt" (Club Mix)- 4:44 
"Dunkie Butt" (Instrumental)- 4:32

Charts

Year-end charts

References

1993 debut singles
1993 songs
Scotti Brothers Records singles